The Magnetic Telescope (1942) is the sixth of the seventeen animated Technicolor short films based upon the DC Comics character of Superman, originally created by Jerry Siegel and Joe Shuster. This animated short was created by the Fleischer Studios. The story runs about eight minutes and covers Superman's adventures in saving the town from a comet drawn toward Earth by a magnetic telescope. It was originally released on April 24, 1942.

Plot
The story begins with Clark Kent and Lois Lane, along with the entire town, observing a scientist's (who resembles Captain Marvel's nemesis Doctor Sivana) demonstration of his magnetic telescope. A giant, u-shaped magnet connected to the telescope is pointed at a comet and turned on, drawing the comet towards the observers. Something goes wrong, however, and the comet crashes into the town, rolls through the streets, and then tumbles into the ocean nearby.

Newspapers the next day report the disaster, and the police are shown arguing with the scientist, who claims the importance of his work is worth the risk of human lives. The police say, as Lois looks on, that they will stop any attempt to try the experiment again, but the scientist refuses to quit, reminding them that any attempt to stop him could prove disastrous. He runs into his telescope room and shuts the door before the police can stop him, and begins his experiment again. Just as the magnet pulls the comet into earth's gravitational pull, the police jam a piece of metal into the electric generator running his machine and cut its main wires with axes. The comet, now out of the scientist's control, hurtles towards the town in a bright circle of light.

As the police and scientist flee, Lois calls the Daily Planet from the scientist's building, reporting the impending disaster as the building crumbles around her and pins her. Clark happens to be standing nearby, and takes a cab to get to the telescope. As he nears the building, pieces of the comet destroy the road in front of them, and the cabby flees; Clark takes this opportunity to change clothes in the back of the car, becoming Superman.

Superman saves Lois from the rubble of comet-shards, and then streaks towards the hurtling comet, striking it full-force, but he bounces off, delaying the inevitable only slightly. While Superman lies unconscious, more comet-shards crush buildings, cars and trains across the town. Superman awakes and flies at the comet again, but with similar results, falling into the telescope's generator room. He notices the metal bar in the generator and removes it, then winds some cable around its rod and pulls, sending the generator into motion. He then completes the circuit to the scope by grabbing both ends of the cut wire and allowing the electric current to run through his chest from arm to arm. Lois sets the machine to reverse, and the comet is sent back into space just in time. Superman's silhouette appears in the telescope control room, and Lois kisses him; much to her chagrin, the silhouette is Clark.

Cast
 Bud Collyer as Clark Kent / Superman, Professor
 Joan Alexander as Lois Lane
 Julian Noa as Perry White
 Jackson Beck as the Narrator, Police Officer, Cab Driver

References

External links
 
 
 The Magnetic Telescope at the Internet Archive
 The Magnetic Telescope at the Internet Movie Database

1942 short films
1942 animated films
1940s American animated films
1940s animated short films
1940s animated superhero films
Superman animated shorts
Fleischer Studios short films
Short films directed by Dave Fleischer
Films about impact events
Paramount Pictures short films
Rotoscoped films
1940s English-language films
American animated short films